Tora! Tora! Tora! is a 1970 epic war film that dramatizes the Japanese attack on Pearl Harbor in 1941. The film was produced by Elmo Williams and directed by Richard Fleischer, Toshio Masuda and Kinji Fukasaku, and stars an ensemble cast including Martin Balsam, Joseph Cotten, So Yamamura, E.G. Marshall, James Whitmore, Tatsuya Mihashi, Takahiro Tamura, Wesley Addy, and Jason Robards. It was Masuda and Fukasaku's first English-language film, and first international co-production. The tora of the title is the two-syllable Japanese codeword used to indicate that complete surprise had been achieved.

The film was released in the United States by Twentieth Century Fox on September 23, 1970, and in Japan by the Toei Company on September 25. It received mixed reviews from American critics, but was praised for its historical accuracy and attention to detail, its visual effects, and its action sequences. A 1994 survey at the USS Arizona Memorial determined that for Americans the film was the most common source of popular knowledge about the Pearl Harbor attack. 

Tora! Tora! Tora! was nominated for five Oscars at the 43rd Academy Awards, including Best Cinematography and Best Film Editing, winning Best Visual Effects (L.B. Abbott and A.D. Flowers). The National Board of Review ranked it in its Top Ten Films of 1971.

Plot
In August 1939, the United States imposes a trade embargo on a belligerent Japan, severely limiting raw materials. Influential Japanese army figures and politicians push through an alliance with Germany and Italy in September 1940 despite opposition from the Japanese navy and prepare for war. The newly appointed Commander-in-Chief of the Combined Fleet, Admiral Isoroku Yamamoto, reluctantly plans a pre-emptive strike on the U.S. Pacific Fleet anchored at Pearl Harbor, believing that Japan's best hope of controlling the Pacific Ocean is to quickly annihilate the American fleet. Air Staff Officer Minoru Genda is chosen to mastermind the operation while his old Naval Academy classmate Mitsuo Fuchida is selected to lead the attack.

Meanwhile, in Washington, U.S. military intelligence has broken the Japanese Purple Code, allowing them to intercept secret Japanese radio transmissions indicating increased Japanese naval activity. Monitoring the transmissions are U.S. Army Col. Bratton and U.S. Navy Lt. Commander Kramer. At Pearl Harbor itself, Admiral Kimmel increases defensive naval and air patrols around Hawaii which could provide early warning of enemy presence. General Short recommends concentrating aircraft at the base on the runways to avoid sabotage by enemy agents in Hawaii, so General Howard Davidson of the 14th Pursuit Wing tries dispersing some of the planes to other airfields on Oahu to maintain air readiness.

Several months pass while diplomatic tensions escalate. As the Japanese ambassador to Washington continues negotiations to stall for time, the large Japanese fleet sorties into the Pacific. On the day of the attack, Bratton and Kramer learn from intercepts that the Japanese plan a series of 14 radio messages from Tokyo to the Japanese embassy in Washington. They are also directed to destroy their code machines after receiving the final message. Deducing the Japanese intention to launch a surprise attack immediately after the messages are delivered, Bratton tries warning his superiors of his suspicions but encounters several obstacles: Chief of Naval Operations Harold R. Stark is indecisive over notifying Hawaii without first alerting the President while Army Chief of Staff General George Marshall's order that Pearl Harbor be alerted of an impending attack is stymied by poor atmospherics that prevent radio transmission and by bungling when a warning sent by telegram is not marked urgent. At dawn on December 7, the Japanese fleet launches its aircraft. Their approach to Hawaii is detected by two radar operators but their concerns are dismissed by the duty officer. Similarly the claim by the destroyer USS Ward to have sunk a Japanese miniature submarine off the entrance to Pearl Harbor is dismissed as unimportant. The Japanese thus achieve complete and total surprise and Commander Fuchida sends the code to begin the attack: "Tora! Tora! Tora!"

The damage to the naval base is catastrophic and casualties are severe. Seven battleships are either sunk or heavily damaged. General Short's anti-sabotage precautions prove a disastrous mistake that allows the Japanese aerial forces to destroy aircraft on the ground easily. Hours after the attack ends, General Short and Admiral Kimmel receive Marshall's telegram warning of impending danger. In Washington, Secretary of State Cordell Hull is stunned to learn of the attack and urgently requests confirmation before receiving the Japanese ambassador. The message that was transmitted to the Japanese embassy in 14 parts – including a declaration that peace negotiations were at an end – was meant to be delivered to the Americans at 1:00 pm in Washington, 30 minutes before the attack. However, it was not decoded and transcribed in time, meaning the attack started while the two nations were technically still at peace. The distraught Japanese ambassador, helpless to explain the late ultimatum and unaware of the ongoing attack, is bluntly rebuffed by Hull.

Back in the Pacific, the Japanese fleet commander, Vice-Admiral Chūichi Nagumo, refuses to launch a scheduled third wave of aircraft for fear of exposing his force to U.S. submarines. Aboard his flagship, Admiral Yamamoto solemnly informs his staff that their primary target – the American aircraft carriers – were not at Pearl Harbor, having departed days previously to search for Japanese vessels. Lamenting that the declaration of war arrived after the attack began, Yamamoto notes that nothing would infuriate the U.S. more and ominously concludes: "I fear all we have done is to awaken a sleeping giant and fill him with a terrible resolve."

Cast
Note: Characters listed by rank in descending order

Americans

Japanese

Civilians

Production

Veteran 20th Century Fox executive Darryl F. Zanuck, who had earlier produced The Longest Day (1962), wanted to create an epic that depicted what "really happened on December 7, 1941", with a "revisionist's approach". He believed that the commanders in Hawaii, General Short and Admiral Kimmel, though scapegoated for decades, provided adequate defensive measures for the apparent threats, including relocation of the fighter aircraft at Pearl Harbor to the middle of the base, in response to fears of sabotage from local Japanese. Despite a breakthrough in intelligence, they had received limited warning of the increasing risk of aerial attack. Recognizing that a balanced and objective recounting was necessary, Zanuck developed an American-Japanese co-production, allowing for "a point of view from both nations". He was helped out by his son, Richard D. Zanuck, who was chief executive at Fox during this time.

Production on Tora! Tora! Tora! took three years to plan and prepare for the eight months of principal photography. The film was created in two separate productions, one based in the United States, directed by Richard Fleischer, and one based in Japan. The Japanese side was initially to be directed by Akira Kurosawa, who worked on script development and pre-production for two years. But after two weeks of shooting, he was replaced by Toshio Masuda and Kinji Fukasaku, who directed the Japanese sections.

Richard Fleischer said of Akira Kurosawa's role in the project:

Larry Forrester and frequent Kurosawa collaborators Hideo Oguni and Ryūzō Kikushima wrote the screenplay, based on books written by Ladislas Farago and Gordon Prange of the University of Maryland, who served as a technical consultant. Numerous technical advisors on both sides, some of whom had participated in the battle and/or planning, were crucial in maintaining the accuracy of the film. Minoru Genda, the man who largely planned and led the attack on Pearl Harbor, was an uncredited technical advisor for the film.

Four cinematographers were involved in the main photography: Charles F. Wheeler, Shinsaku Himeda, Masamichi Satoh, and Osamu Furuya. They were jointly nominated for the Academy Award for Best Cinematography. A number of well-known cameramen also worked on the second units without credit, including Thomas Del Ruth and Rexford Metz. The second unit doing miniature photography was directed by Ray Kellogg, while the second unit doing aerial sequences was directed by Robert Enrietto.

Noted composer Jerry Goldsmith composed the film score and Robert McCall painted several scenes for various posters of the film.

The carrier entering Pearl Harbor towards the end of the film was in fact the Essex-class aircraft carrier , returning to port. The "Japanese" aircraft carrier was the anti-submarine carrier , fitted with a false bow to disguise the catapults. The Japanese A6M Zero fighters, and somewhat longer "Kate" torpedo bombers or "Val" dive bombers were heavily modified Royal Canadian Air Force Harvard (T-6 Texan) and BT-13 Valiant pilot training aircraft. The large fleet of Japanese aircraft was created by Lynn Garrison, a well-known aerial action coordinator, who produced a number of conversions. Garrison and Jack Canary coordinated the actual engineering work at facilities in the Los Angeles area. These aircraft still make appearances at air shows.

These were used for much of the Japanese scenes on ship's decks. The one error introduced, however, was that the model Akagis bridge was built on the starboard side instead of the port side. This was done because it was known that for the launching scenes filmed in the US, a US carrier would be used and the islands of US carriers were always on the starboard side. A few of the modified aircraft were also converted in Japan for the flight scenes filmed there.

In preparation for filming, Yorktown was berthed at NAS North Island in San Diego to load all the aircraft, maintenance, and film crew prior to sailing to Hawaii. The night before filming the "Japanese" take-off scenes she sailed to a spot a few miles west of San Diego and at dawn the film crew filmed the launches of all the aircraft. Since these "Japanese" aircraft were not actual carrier-based aircraft, they did not have arresting gear with which to land back on the carrier, and continued on to land at North Island Naval Air Station. Yorktown sailed back to North Island and re-loaded the aircraft. She then sailed to Hawaii and the aircraft were off-loaded and used to film the attack scenes in and around Pearl Harbor. Aircraft Specialties of Mesa, Arizona performed maintenance on the aircraft while in Hawaii.

A Boeing B-17 Flying Fortress's actual crash landing during filming, a result of a jammed landing gear, was filmed and used in the final cut. The film crew received word that one of the B-17s could not lower their starboard landing gear so they quickly set up to film the "single gear" landing. The aircraft stayed aloft to use up as much fuel as possible, which gave the film crew some time to prepare, prior to landing. After viewing the "single gear" landing footage they decided to include it in the movie. In the sequence depicting the crash, only the final crash was actual footage. For the scenes leading up to the crash they manually retracted the starboard landing gear on a functioning B-17 and filmed the scenes of its final approach. After touching down on one wheel the pilot simply applied power and took off again. The B-17 that actually landed with one gear up sustained only minor damage to the starboard wing and propellers and was repaired and returned to service. A total of five Boeing B-17s were obtained for filming. Other U.S. aircraft used are the Consolidated PBY Catalina and, especially, the Curtiss P-40 Warhawk (two flyable examples were used). Predominantly, P-40 fighter aircraft are used to depict the U.S. defenders with a full-scale P-40 used as a template for fiberglass replicas (some with working engines and props) that were strafed and blown up during filming. Fleischer also said a scene involving a P-40 model crashing into the middle of a line of P-40s was unintended, as it was supposed to crash at the end of the line. The stuntmen involved in the scene were actually running for their lives. The B-17 crash along with several other scenes were reused in the 1976 film Midway.

With over 30 aircraft in the air, the flying scenes were complex to shoot, and can be compared to the 1969 film Battle of Britain where large formations of period-specific aircraft were filmed in staged aerial battles. The 2001 film Pearl Harbor would use some of the same modified aircraft.

Casting 
The film was deliberately cast with actors who were not true box-office stars, including many Japanese amateurs, in order to place the emphasis on the story rather than the actors who were in it.

Several members of the cast had themselves served in World War II.

Some crew members also served in the War.

Some cast members served before or after World War II.

Historical accuracy

The ship was leased by the film producers, who needed an aircraft carrier for the film, and as Yorktown was scheduled to be decommissioned in 1970, the Navy made her available. She was used largely in the takeoff sequence of the Japanese attack aircraft. The sequence shows interchanging shots of models of the Japanese aircraft carriers and Yorktown. She does not look like any of the Japanese carriers involved in the attack, due to her large bridge island and her angled landing deck. The Japanese carriers had small bridge islands, and it wasn't until after the war that angled flight decks were developed. In addition, during the scene in which Admiral Halsey is watching bombing practice, an aircraft carrier with the hull number 14 is shown. This is understandable, however, as Enterprise and all six of the Japanese carriers from the attack had been scrapped or sunk.

In Tora! Tora! In the film, Akagis bridge island is positioned on the starboard side of the ship, which is typical on most aircraft carriers. However, Akagi was an exception; her bridge island was on the port side of the ship. Despite this, the bridge section appeared accurately as a mirrored version of Akagis real port-side bridge. Secondly, all the Japanese aircraft in the footage bear the markings of Akagis aircraft (a single vertical red stripe following the red sun symbol of Japan), even though five other aircraft carriers participated, each having its own markings. In addition, the markings do not display the aircraft's identification numbers as was the case in the actual battle. The white surround on the roundel on the Japanese aircraft was only used from 1942 onwards. Prior to this, the roundel was red only.

 was an old "4-piper" destroyer commissioned in 1918; the ship used in the movie, which portrays Ward, looked far different from the original destroyer. In addition, in the movie, she fired two shots from her #1 gun turret. In reality, Ward fired the first shot from the #1  un-turreted gunmount and the second shot from the #3 wing mount. The attack on the midget submarine by USS Ward was previously mentioned in the film In Harm's Way.

The lattice mast (or cage mast) section of the /Maryland-class battleship was built beside the set of the USS Nevada stern section, but not built upon a set of a deck, but on the ground, as the footage in the movie only showed the cage mast tower. The large scale model of the stern shows the two aft gun turrets with three gun barrels in each; in reality, Nevada had two heightened fore and aft turrets with two barrels each while the lower two turrets fore and aft had three barrels each. Another model of Nevada, used in the film to portray the whole ship, displays the turrets accurately. The reason for this anomaly is because the aft section model was used in the film to portray both USS Nevada and USS Arizona. The ships looked remarkably similar except that Arizona had four triple turrets and a slightly different stern section. Footage and photographs not used in the film show the cage mast as being built on the ground. The USS Nevada/USS Arizona stern section was shown exploding to represent the explosion that destroyed Arizona, although in reality the explosion took place in #2 magazine, forward, and Arizonas stern section remains essentially intact to this day.

The film has a Japanese Zero fighter being damaged over a naval base and then deliberately crashing into a naval base hangar. This is actually a composite of three incidents during the Pearl Harbor attack: in the first wave, a Japanese Zero crashed into Fort Kamehameha's ordnance building; in the second wave, a Japanese Zero did deliberately crash into a hillside after U.S. Navy CPO John William Finn at Naval Air Station at Kāneʻohe Bay had shot and damaged the aircraft; also during the second wave, a Japanese aircraft that was damaged crashed into the seaplane tender .

During a number of shots of the attack squadrons traversing across Oahu, a white cross can be seen standing on one of the mountainsides. The cross was actually erected after the attack as a memorial to the victims of the attack.

In the final scene, Admiral Isoroku Yamamoto says "I fear all we have done is to awaken a sleeping giant". An abridged version of the quotation is also featured in the 2001 film Pearl Harbor. The 2019 film Midway also features Yamamoto speaking aloud the sleeping giant quote. Although the quotation may well have encapsulated many of his real feelings about the attack, there is no printed evidence to prove Yamamoto made this statement or wrote it down.

Release
The film had its world premiere on September 23, 1970, in New York, Tokyo, Honolulu and Los Angeles.

Reception

Box office
At the time of its initial release, Tora! Tora! Tora! was thought to be a box office disappointment in North America, despite its domestic box office of $29,548,291 making it the ninth-highest-grossing film of 1970. It was a major hit in Japan, and over the years, home media releases provided a larger overall profit. The film had earned  in Japanese distributor rentals by 1971, becoming the sixth-highest-grossing film of 1971 in Japan.

According to Fox records, the film required  in rentals to break even, and had done so by December 11, 1970.

Critical response

Roger Ebert felt that Tora! Tora! Tora! was "one of the deadest, dullest blockbusters ever made" and suffered from not having "some characters to identify with." In addition, he criticized the film for poor acting and special effects in his 1970 review. Vincent Canby, reviewer for The New York Times, was similarly unimpressed, noting the film was "nothing less than a $25-million irrelevancy." Variety also found the film to be boring; however, the magazine praised the film's action sequences and production values.  Charles Champlin in his review for the Los Angeles Times on September 23, 1970, considered the movie's chief virtues as a "spectacular", and the careful recreation of a historical event.

Despite the initial negative reviews, the film was critically acclaimed for its vivid action scenes, and found favor with aviation aficionados. However, even the team of Jack Hardwick and Ed Schnepf who have been involved in research on aviation films, had relegated Tora! Tora! Tora! to the "also-ran" status, due to its slow-moving plotline. On Rotten Tomatoes, the film holds a 55% rating based on 29 reviews. The site's consensus states: "Tora! Tora! Tora! is scrupulously accurate and lays out of the tragedy of Pearl Harbor with intricate detail, but the film's clinical approach to the sound and fury signifies little feeling." On Metacritic it has a score of 46% based on reviews from 8 critics, indicating "mixed or average reviews". In 1994, a survey at the USS Arizona Memorial in Honolulu determined that for Americans the film was the most common source of popular knowledge about the Pearl Harbor attack.

Several later films and TV series relating to World War II in the Pacific have used footage from Tora! Tora! Tora!. These productions include the films Midway (1976; in the Tora! Tora! Tora! DVD commentary, Fleischer is angry that Universal used the footage), All This and World War II (film 1976), Pearl (TV mini-series 1978), From Here to Eternity (TV mini-series 1979), The Final Countdown (1980), and Australia (2008) as well as the Magnum, P. I. television series episode titled "Lest We Forget" (first airdate February 12, 1981).

Awards and nominations

See also
 List of American films of 1970
 Attack on Pearl Harbor
 Isoroku Yamamoto's sleeping giant quote
 Pearl Harbor (film)
 List of historical drama films
 List of historical drama films of Asia

References

Sources

 Agawa, Hiroyuki. The Reluctant Admiral: Yamamoto and the Imperial Navy. Tokyo: Kodansha International, 2000. .
 Dolan, Edward F. Jr. Hollywood Goes to War. London: Bison Books, 1985. .
 Galbraith, Stuart, IV. The Emperor and the Wolf: The Lives and Films of Akira Kurosawa and Toshiro Mifune. New York: Faber & Faber, Inc., 2002. .
 Hardwick, Jack and Ed Schnepf. "A Viewer's Guide to Aviation Movies." The Making of the Great Aviation Films. General Aviation Series, Volume 2, 1989.
 Hathaway, John. "Tora! Tora! Tora!" Flying Review, Vol. 25, No. 3, July 1969.
 O'Hara, Bob. "Tora Tora Tora: A great historical flying film." Air Classics, Volume 6, No. 1, October 1969.
 Carnes, Mark C. "Tora! Tora! Tora!" Past Imperfect: History According to the Movies. New York: Holt, 1996. .
 Orriss, Bruce. When Hollywood Ruled the Skies: The Aviation Film Classics of World War II. Hawthorn, California: Aero Associates Inc., 2014, first edition 1984. .
 Parish, James Robert. The Great Combat Pictures: Twentieth-Century Warfare on the Screen. Metuchen, New Jersey: The Scarecrow Press, 1990. .
 Prange, Gordon. "Tora! Tora! Tora!" Reader's Digest, November 1963 and December 1963.
 <cite id=Robertson1961>Robertson, Bruce. Aircraft Camouflage and Markings, 1907–1954. London: Harleyford Publications, 1961. .</cite>
 Shinsato, Douglas and Tadanori Urabe. For That One Day: The Memoirs of Mitsuo Fuchida, Commander of the Attack on Pearl Harbor. Kamuela, Hawaii: eXperience, inc., 2011. .
 Thorsten, Marie and Geoffrey White. "Binational Pearl Harbor?: Tora! Tora! Tora! and the Fate of (Trans)national Memory." The Asia-Pacific Journal: Japan Focus'', December 27, 2010.

External links

 
 
 
 
 Prange, Gordon W.

1970 films
1970 war films
American war films
Japanese war films
English-language Japanese films
1970s Japanese-language films
Epic films based on actual events
World War II aviation films
Pacific War films
Films directed by Kinji Fukasaku
Films directed by Richard Fleischer
Films set in 1939
Films set in 1940
Films set in 1941
Films set in Tokyo
Films set in Washington, D.C.
Films shot in Honolulu
Films that won the Best Visual Effects Academy Award
Pearl Harbor films
Seafaring films based on actual events
World War II films based on actual events
War epic films
Films about the United States Navy in World War II
20th Century Fox films
Toei Company films
Films about the United States Army Air Forces
American docudrama films
Films scored by Jerry Goldsmith
Films with screenplays by Hideo Oguni
Films with screenplays by Ryuzo Kikushima
Films with screenplays by Akira Kurosawa
Seafaring films
Films produced by Masayuki Takagi
Historical epic films
American epic films
American multilingual films
Japanese multilingual films
Cultural depictions of Isoroku Yamamoto
Japan in non-Japanese culture
American World War II films
Japanese World War II films
Films set on aircraft carriers
1970s American films
1970s Japanese films